Takes is the third studio album by British singer/songwriter Adem.  It is a covers album, consisting primarily of covers of 90s pop/alternative tracks.

Track listing

References

2008 albums
Adem Ilhan albums
Domino Recording Company albums
Covers albums